Cranborne Hundred was a hundred in the county of Dorset, England, containing the following parishes:

Ashmore
Belchalwell (divided between Okeford Fitzpaine and Fifehead Neville 1884)
Cranborne (part)
East Woodyates (created 1858)
Edmondsham (part)
Farnham
Hampreston (part; entire from the 1860s, when the other part was transferred from Hampshire)
Pentridge
Shillingstone
Tarrant Gunville
Tarrant Rushton
Tollard Royal (divided between Dorset and Wiltshire until the 1880s, when the Dorset part was transferred to Wiltshire)
Turnworth
West Parley
Witchampton
(Alderholt and Verwood were created from Cranborne in 1894)

See also
List of hundreds in Dorset

Sources
Boswell, Edward, 1833: The Civil Division of the County of Dorset (published on CD by Archive CD Books Ltd, 1992)
Hutchins, John, History of Dorset, vols 1-4 (3rd ed 1861–70; reprinted by EP Publishing, Wakefield, 1973)
Mills, A. D., 1977, 1980, 1989: Place Names of Dorset, parts 1–3. English Place Name Society: Survey of English Place Names vols LII, LIII and 59/60

Hundreds of Dorset